The 1340s BC is a decade which lasted from 1349 BC to 1340 BC.

Events and trends
c. 1348 BC—Pharaoh Amenhotep IV changes his name to Akhenaten.
1348 BC–1336 BC: Akhenaten and his family, relief from Akhetaten (modern el-Amarna) was made. 18th dynasty. It is now in Staatliche Museen zu Berlin, Preussischer Kulturbesitz, Ägyptisches Museum.
c. 1348 BC–1336 BC: Nefertiti, bust from Akhetaten (modern Amarna) was made. 18th dynasty. It is now in Staatliche Museen zu Berlin, Preussischer Kulturbesitz, Ägyptisches Museum.
c. 1348 BC–1336 BC: Tish-shaped vase, from Akhetaten (modern Tell el-Amarna) was made. 18th dynasty. It is now in the British Museum, London.
c. 1348 BC–1327 BC: State ship, detail of a tempera facsimile by Charles K. Wilkinson of a cow painting in the tomb of the governor of Nubia Amenhotep Huy in Qurnet Murai was made. 18th dynasty. It is now in the Metropolitan Museum of Art, New York.
1347 BC—Legendary King Erechtheus II is reportedly killed by lightning after a reign of 50 years and is succeeded by his younger brother Cecrops II.
1346 BC—Amenhotep IV of Egypt begins his Cult of Aten and begins construction of Amarna intended to be his new capital. 
1345 BC–Amenhotep IV of Egypt renames himself to Akhenaten.
c. 1344 BC–King Šuppiluliuma I of the Hittites invades the Anatolian heartland and launches two campaigns against the Mitanni. This culminates in the sack of the Mitanni capital Washukanni.
1342 BC—Pharaoh King Tut (Tutankhamun/Tutankhamen) is born.
c. 1340 BC—Citadel walls are built in Mycenae.

Births
 c. 1341 BC - Tutankhamun, Pharaoh of Egypt
 c. 1348 BC - Ankhesenamun

References